Beneath the Skin is the second studio album by Icelandic indie folk band Of Monsters and Men; it was released on 8 June 2015 in Iceland, and a day later in the rest of the world. 
The album artwork and design was created by artistic director Leif Podhajsky. It debuted at number three on US Billboard 200, and sold 61,000 copies in its first week, becoming the band's highest-charting album in the country.

The album title is derived from a lyric in the song "Human": "Plants awoke and they slowly grow beneath the skin."

The album was nominated for Best Boxed or Special Limited Edition Package at the 58th Annual Grammy Awards.

Singles
"Crystals", "I of the Storm", "Empire", "Hunger" and "Wolves Without Teeth" were released as the album's singles.

Critical reception

Beneath the Skin received generally positive reviews from critics. Madison Vain of Entertainment Weekly stated, "Lyrics brim with woodsy imagery, and the sweet vocals elevate these campfire tunes into something extravagant.

Commercial performance
On the chart dated 27 June 2015, Beneath The Skin debuted at number 3 on the US Billboard 200 chart with 61,000 copies in the first week of its release (including 57,000 pure album sales), becoming the highest-charting album by the band there. Its first-week sales made it the best sales week of the band.

The album also made it entry at number 10 on the UK Albums Chart, selling 8,437 copies. It dropped to number 40 with 2,749 units in the second week on chart.

Track listing
All songs are credited to Of Monsters and Men, but were actually written by the band's individuals and/or others. The actual writers are listed alongside the tracks.

Music and lyric videos
There are three music videos, each for "Crystals", "Empire", and "Wolves Without Teeth". In addition, there are thirteen lyric videos.

Lyric videos
 "Crystals" lyric video features actor Siggi Sigurjóns lip-syncing the song's lyrics.
 "I of the Storm" lyric video features actor Atli Freyr Demantur lip-syncing the song's lyrics.
 "Empire" lyric video features actress Guðrún Bjarnadóttir lip-syncing the song's lyrics. 
 "Hunger" lyric video features actress Natalie G. Gunnarsdóttir lip-syncing the song's lyrics. 
 "Human" lyric video features actor Björn Stefánsson lip-syncing the song's lyrics.
 "Organs" lyric video features one of the band's lead vocalists Nanna lip-syncing the song's lyrics.
 "Thousand Eyes" lyric video features actor Ingvar E. Sigurðsson lip-syncing the song's lyrics. 
 "Wolves Without Teeth" lyric video features actresses Erna Jónasdóttir and Hrefna Jónasdóttir lip-syncing the song's lyrics.
 "Black Water" lyric video features actress Guðrún Gísladóttir lip-syncing the song's lyrics.
 "Winter Sound" lyric video features actor Ólafur Darri Ólafsson lip-syncing the song's lyrics.
 "Slow Life" lyric video features actor Tómas Lemarquis lip-syncing the song's lyrics.
"We Sink" lyric video features actors Heba Aljakari, Jimmy Salinas, Julie Loparia, Kansha Iyassu, Khaalid Saaid Jeylani, Majid Zarei and Nazanin Askari lip-syncing the song's lyrics.
"Backyard" lyric video features actress Dýrfinna Benita lip-syncing the song's lyrics.

All the videos start with their title cards.

Music videos
"Crystals" features the band dressed as construction workers in a warehouse, creating a girlish creature with crystal eyes out of her shame.
"Empire" is filmed in black and white and features a young woman who has a very close relationship with another woman. The two of them hang out and it is implied that the young woman looks up to the other woman as a mentor figure in life. Time passes and it is revealed that it was just flashbacks as the young woman - now old - reflects on her life and wonders if she has really changed.
"Wolves Without Teeth" features a man and a woman performing cha-cha dancing for judges in a gym.

Charts

Weekly charts

Year-end charts

Certifications

References

2015 albums
Of Monsters and Men albums
Republic Records albums